A game creation system(GCS) is a consumer-targeted game engine and a set of specialized design tools (and sometimes a light scripting language), engineered for the rapid iteration of user-derived video games. Examples include Novashell and Pie in the Sky.

Unlike more developer-oriented game engines, game creation systems promise an easy entry point for novice or hobbyist game designers, with often little to no coding required for simple behaviors. Although initially stigmatized, all-in-one game creation systems have gained some legitimacy with the central role of Unity, Pixel Game Maker MV, and GameMaker: Studio in the growth of the indie game development community. Currently the Independent Games Festival recognizes games produced with similar platforms.

Early game creation systems such as Broderbund's The Arcade Machine (1982),  Pinball Construction Set (1983), ASCII's War Game Construction Kit (1983), Thunder Force Construction (1984), Adventure Construction Set (1984), Garry Kitchen's GameMaker (1985). Wargame Construction Set (1986), Shoot'Em-Up Construction Kit (1987), Mamirin / Dungeon Manjirou (1988), and Arcade Game Construction Kit (1988) appeared in the 1980s on home computers. 3D Construction Kit was released on the ZX Spectrum in 1991, and contained a full polygon-based world creation tool. Most of these early design frameworks are specific to one or another genre.

In the 1990s, game creation systems for the IBM PC shifted both to the more general and the more specific. Whereas frameworks like RSD Game-Maker and Klik & Play attempted to accommodate any genre, communities grew around games like ZZT (later, MegaZeux) that permitted such extensive user modification that they essentially became de facto game creation systems. Pie in the Sky Software created a full on 2.5D first-person shooter creator out of an engine they previously used internally, which sold in three total versions until 2003; 3D Game Studio and products by The Game Creators have targeted similar creators.

In the mid-2000s, with the growth of the World Wide Web and social networking, programs like BlitzBasic and Multimedia Fusion headlined an explosion of interest both in indie games and in canned game design software. Whereas earlier game creation systems tend to err on the side of user friendly interfaces, 21st-century systems are often distinguished by extensive scripting languages that attempt to account for every possible user variable. Other general purpose game creation systems include Game Editor, Construct, Stencyl, and GDevelop.

Features

Tools
Several game creation systems include some of the following tools:
 Integrated development environment: for managing projects and resources
 Command-line interface: for compiling and debugging games
 Sprite editor: for the editing of animated images commonly referred to as sprites
 Model editor: for 3D modeling purposes
 Map/Scene editor: generally used for object and tile placement

Scripting
The rise of game creation systems also saw a rise in the need for free form scripting languages with general purpose use. Some packages, such as Conitec's Gamestudio, include a more comprehensive scripting language under the surface to allow users more leeway in defining their games' behavior.

Usage
While most of the mainstream and popular game creation systems may be general-purpose, several exist solely for specific genres.

 Adventure games: World Builder, Adventure Game Studio, Twine
 First-person shooters: 3D Game Creation System, FPS Creator
 Fighting games: Fighter Maker, Mugen
 Role-playing games: RPG Maker, OHRRPGCE
 Dungeon crawlers: Forgotten Realms: Unlimited Adventures, The Bard's Tale Construction Set
 Space combat game: Wing Commander Academy
 Visual novels: Ren'Py
 Massively multiplayer online games: Roblox, Core, Rec Room
 Platform games: LittleBigPlanet, Super Mario Maker, PlataGO!
 General-purpose: Dreams, Nintendo Labo Toy-Con 04: VR Kit, Game Builder Garage

See also
 Game engine
 Level editor

References

External links
 Game Creation Systems (DOSGames.com)
 Game Creation Systems (SavvyFrog.com)
 Game Creation Tools Classification (creatools.gameclassification.com)

Video game engines
Video game development software